Cucurbita californica is a species of flowering plant in the squash family.

The species was first identified by Sereno Watson in 1876. There is disagreement about whether this is a separate species from Cucurbita palmata. In 1883 botanist C. C. Parry reported it was distinguishable from C. palmata by its smaller fruit and foliage, and fruit that is a dull green with thin ridges. It is similar to Cucurbita cordata, Cucurbita cylindrata, Cucurbita digitata,  and Cucurbita palmata and all these species hybridize readily.

References 

californica
Plants described in 1876
Squashes and pumpkins